Dandy in the Underworld is the twelfth and final studio album by English rock band T. Rex. It was released on 11 March 1977 by record label EMI. It reached No. 26 in the UK charts, the band's highest-charting album since 1974's Zinc Alloy. The leading single "I Love to Boogie" had been a hit single in the UK the previous year, peaking at number 13 in the singles chart.

Dandy in the Underworld was regarded by critics as a comeback for the band. It was praised for the strength of the songwriting and Bolan's vocal performances. However, it would prove to be the band's final album, as Marc Bolan died in a car crash in September 1977 at age 29. In 2006, an album of alternate versions and unreleased tracks called Final Cuts was released.

Background and recording 
At the time of the album's release, Marc Bolan and T. Rex were on a UK tour, supported by The Damned. The album and tour were notable for marking a return to form for the band.

The sessions had started in May 1976 at Decibel Studios London, with the recording of "I Love to Boogie'", with Steve Currie (bass), Davey Lutton (drums) and Dino Dines (piano). Later recordings took place at MRI Studios, Los Angeles, United States and continued at Decibel Studios, AIR Studios and Trident Studios in London, England.

The track "Visions of Domino" was a re-recording of an unreleased song, "Funky London Childhood" with completely rewritten lyrics.

Music
Biographer Mark Paytress noted that the "plastic soul" style of the band's previous works was no more. Bolan had reacquainted himself with the rock rhythms of his youth on the album. Bolan's production was more direct. Most of the material had been recorded in 1976.

Release 
Dandy in the Underworld was released on 11 March 1977. It was launched at London's leading punk rock venue The Roxy.

The title track was released as a single in a remixed and re-recorded version with the offending lyrics "Exalted companion of cocaine nights" being changed to "T. Rex nights". "Crimson Moon" was also released as a single the same year, as well as the non-album track "Celebrate Summer" in August.

Dandy in the Underworld was remastered for CD by Edsel Records in 1994 as part of their extensive T. Rex reissue campaign. A number of bonus tracks were added (see below). A companion release, entitled Prince of Players (The Alternate Dandy in the Underworld) was released in 1998 and contained alternative versions and studio rough mixes of the main album and bonus tracks. A combined album digipak was released in 2002.

An album of unreleased tracks and alternate versions of songs from the sessions that produced the album was released in 2006 called "Final Cuts". Most of these tracks were recorded at AIR Studios Oxford Street, with the addition of four tracks recorded at Decibel Studios in Stamford Hill in April 1977 after the release of Dandy in the Underworld . Seven of the twelve songs on "Final Cuts" were not released during Bolan's lifetime. It includes an alternate cut of the final T.Rex single 'Celebrate Summer' as well as 'Mellow Love', 'Write Me A Song', 'Hot George', 'Shy Boy', 'Foxy Boy', 'Love Drunk' and '20th Century Baby'.

Reception and legacy

Dandy in the Underworld gathered the most consistently positive reviews for any T. Rex album in five years. Having fallen from critical and commercial favour, the band had endured some fiercely hostile press, but NME, which had been amongst the most negative, noted of the album: "very listenable, well arranged [and] immaculately played."

In a positive retrospective review, AllMusic stated that the album contained "packed solid with powerful pop".. The reviewer noted the "revitalized energy" and claimed it was "the greatest record" Bolan had released in years. Pitchfork praised the album saying,  that it "finds a reinvigorated Bolan crafting some of his best hooks and calibrating his catchiest grooves in years". Reviewer Stephen M. Deusner said the tracks were well balanced: "The cosmic "Crimson Moon", the infectious "I'm a Fool for You Girl", and the album's centerpiece, "Jason B. Sad", alternate between carefree and cautious, conjuring a gravity that counterbalances the upbeat, stripped-down rhythms."

The title track was prominently used in BBC TV series The Pursuit of Love, in the episode one of the first season which was broadcast in 2021.

Track listing 
All tracks written by Marc Bolan, except where noted.

Personnel 

 Marc Bolan – vocals, guitar, bass guitar, percussion, maracas, tambourine
 Steve Harley – backing vocals
 Alfalpha – backing vocals
 Nick Laird-Clowes – backing vocals
 Andy Harley – backing vocals
 Sam Harley – backing vocals
 Gloria Jones – backing vocals
 Colin Jacas – backing vocals
 Dino Dines – keyboards
 Tony Newman – drums
 Herbie Flowers – bass guitar
 Scott Edwards – bass guitar
 Paul Humphrey – drums
 Miller Anderson – guitar
 Steve Currie – bass guitar
 Davy Lutton – drums
 Bernie Casey - backing vocals on "The Soul of My suit"
 Chris Mercer – saxophone
 Bud Beadle – saxophone, flute
 J.B. Long – violin

Technical
 Mike Stavrou - engineer AIR Studios
 Jon Walls - engineer AIR Studios
Jennifer Maidman - engineer Decibel Studio
 Mick O'Halloran - Tour Manager/Backline
 Cliff Wright - Backline/Guitar tech
 Produced by Marc Bolan

Charts

References

External links 

 
 Dedicated website for the Dandy in the Underworld album and tour

1977 albums
T. Rex (band) albums
Albums recorded at Trident Studios